The Tolima dove (Leptotila conoveri) is a species of bird in the family Columbidae. It is endemic to Colombia.

Taxonomy and systematics

The Tolima dove is monotypic. It is closely related to the grey-chested dove (Leptotila cassinii) and ochre-bellied dove (Leptotila ochraceiventris), and might form a superspecies with them.

Description

It has a blue-gray to dark gray crown and a reddish hindneck with a violet gloss. Its upper mantle is reddish gray overlain with iridescent violet and the rest of the upperparts are dark gray with purple iridescence. The wings are browner and the tail is slaty with white tips on the outer feathers. The throat is white and the breast reddish pink with a sharp division between it and the buff lower breast and belly.

Distribution and habitat

The Tolima dove was believed to be limited to the eastern slope of Colombia's central Andes in Tolima and Huila Departments. In 2014 it was discovered in Cundinamarca Department in the eastern Andes. However, in the canyon of the Combeima River it is found in disturbed areas including coffee plantations and near human habitation.

Behavior

Feeding

The Tolima dove has been reported as feeding mainly on Bocconia frutescens seeds but nothing else is known about its diet or foraging habits.

Breeding

Observations of Tolima doves in breeding condition, eggs, and nestlings indicate a nesting season that extends at least from March to September. The clutch size is two eggs.

Vocalization

The Tolima dove's song is "a single slightly over-slurred note “wooOOOooo”, with a clear emphasis in the middle."

Status

The IUCN originally assessed the Tolima dove as Threatened, then from 1994 as Endangered, and in 2020 as Near Threatened. It has a restricted range and its population appears to be fragmented. Much of its original habitat has been destroyed but the species appears to adapt to secondary forest and coffee plantations.

References

External links
BirdLife Species Factsheet.

Tolima dove
Birds of the Colombian Andes
Endemic birds of Colombia
Tolima dove
Tolima dove
Tolima dove
Taxonomy articles created by Polbot
Columbidae